The Global Enabling Trade Report was first published in 2008 by the World Economic Forum.

The 2008 report covers 118 major and emerging economies. At the core of the report is the Enabling Trade Index which ranks the countries using data from different sources (e.g., World Economic Forum's Executive Opinion Survey, International Trade Centre, World Bank, the United Nations Conference on Trade and Development (UNCTAD), IATA, ITU, Global Express Association).

The Enabling Trade Index measures the factors, policies and services that facilitate the trade in goods across borders and to destination. It is made up of four sub-indexes: 
 Market access
 Border administration
 Transport and communications infrastructure
 Business environment
Each of these sub-indexes contains two to three pillars that assess different aspects of a country's trade environment.

2016 rankings 

Global Enabling Trade Report 2016

2014 rankings 

Global Enabling Trade Report 2014

2012 rankings 

Global Enabling Trade Report 2012

2010 rankings
Global Enabling Trade Report 2010

2009 rankings
Global Enabling Trade Report 2009

2008 rankings
Global Enabling Trade Report 2008

References

External links
 
 The Global Enabling Trade Report 2010

Economics publications
Commercial policy
International rankings
Global economic indicators
International trade-related lists